Nusa Ceningan is a small island located in Nusa Penida district, Klungkung Regency, Bali, Indonesia; between Nusa Lembongan and Nusa Penida and south of mainland Bali. It lies on the southern side of the Strait of Badung.

There is a notable surf break off Nusa Ceningan which attracts some surfers away from the more crowded breaks on Nusa Lembongan.

The island offers some scenic roads and paths, and the westward views back over Nusa Lembongan to Bali are impressive. Viewing the sunset over Bali from the central Ceningan ridge is very much worth the effort. The estuarine channel between Lembongan and Ceningan is home to many seaweed farms and pristine mangrove forests.

Nusa Ceningan has been slowly growing in popularity since 2009. It is connected to Lembongan island through a narrow bridge. Several resorts and hotels have opened their doors in the recent years. A key tourist attraction is the Mahana cliff jump. This is located on the south easterly side of Nusa Ceningan at Mahana Point Bar. The bar manages two diving platforms at 5 and 13 meters. Jumping is only permitted when the tide is high enough.

References

Bali
Islands of Bali
Klungkung Regency
Populated places in Indonesia